James B. McCormick (March 21, 1884 – September 18, 1959) was an American football player and coach.  He played college football as a fullback at Princeton University from 1904 to 1907.   McCormick also served as the head football coach at Princeton in 1909, tallying a mark of 6–2–1.  He was inducted into the College Football Hall of Fame as a player in 1954.  McCormick served as an officer in the United States Marine Corps during World War I.

Head coaching record

References

External links
 

1884 births
1959 deaths
19th-century players of American football
Princeton Tigers football players
Princeton Tigers football coaches
All-American college football players
College Football Hall of Fame inductees
United States Marine Corps personnel of World War I
United States Marine Corps officers
Phillips Exeter Academy alumni
Sportspeople from Boston
Players of American football from Boston